Squaw Rapids Airport, formerly , is located  south-west of Thunder Rapids Lodge, Saskatchewan, Canada, in the RM of Moose Range No. 486. It is north-east of E.B. Campbell Hydroelectric Station and Tobin Lake by the Saskatchewan River.

See also 
 List of airports in Saskatchewan
 List of defunct airports in Canada

References 

Defunct airports in Saskatchewan
Moose Range No. 486, Saskatchewan